Everett Springs is an unincorporated community in Floyd County, in the U.S. state of Georgia.

History
A post office called Everett Springs was established in 1851, and remained in operation until it was discontinued in 1906. Elkanan Everett, a pioneer settler, gave the community its name.

Notable person
Parson Perryman, a baseball player, was born in Everett Springs.

References

Unincorporated communities in Floyd County, Georgia
Unincorporated communities in Georgia (U.S. state)